Kershaw County School District (KCSD) is a public school district in Kershaw County, South Carolina (US). Led by Superintendent of Schools Dr. Shane Robbins, KCSD serves 10,750+ students and employs 1,200 faculty members across 20 schools. The main office is located on West DeKalb Street in Camden, South Carolina.

History
In 2021 the district began hiring and paying students for some school support positions since there were not enough post-high school applicants for some of the positions.

Technology
In the 2018–19 school year, all 20 schools are wireless and connected by a high-speed wide area network. Students and staff have full-time Internet access in classrooms, libraries and computer labs, including distance learning opportunities. Kershaw County was the first school district in South Carolina to provide individual wireless personal computing devices to all high school students through an $8 million i-CAN initiative in 2004.  All teachers have personal computing devices, and all classrooms are equipped with interactive whiteboards. Students in grades 3–12 are 1:1; preK-2nd grade use technology on mobile carts.

Facilities
In late 2007, the Kershaw County School District undertook a "Facilities Equalization" plan in an effort to give students the same opportunities throughout the county, regardless of where they lived. Phase 1 of the $102.2 million plan includes two new middle schools, Camden Middle School and Lugoff-Elgin Middle School, new wellness facilities at all three high schools, a new elementary school, and two elementary renovation projects.

In November 2016, voters in Kershaw County approved a two-question $129 million referendum to move forward with a number of critical school construction projects in the district.  The referendum addressed aging facilities, growth and safety issues, addressing a total of 17 construction projects.  Among the projects are four new facilities; Camden Elementary School, Lugoff Elementary School and Wateree Elementary School broke ground in May 2017 and estimate completion in December 2018.  The fourth project, the Applied Technology Education Campus (ATEC), broke ground in December 2017 with the estimated opening of August 2019.

High schools
 Camden High School
 Lugoff-Elgin High School
 North Central High School
 Woolard Technology Center – Career and Technology Education
 Continuous Learning Center (CLC) – Alternative Education

Middle schools
 Camden Middle School
 Lugoff-Elgin Middle School
 Leslie. M Stover Middle School
 North Central Middle School

Elementary schools

 Baron DeKalb Elementary School
 Bethune Elementary School
 Blaney Elementary School
 Camden Elementary School
 Doby's Mill Elementary School
 Jackson School
 Lugoff Elementary School
 Midway Elementary School
 Mt. Pisgah Elementary School
 Pine Tree Hill Elementary School
 Wateree Elementary School

See also
Lugoff-Elgin High School
Camden High School (Camden, South Carolina)
Camden Middle School
Kershaw County, South Carolina
Camden, South Carolina
Lugoff, South Carolina

References

External links

Camden, South Carolina
School districts in South Carolina
Education in Kershaw County, South Carolina
Educational institutions with year of establishment missing